Epyx, Inc. was a video game developer and publisher active in the late 1970s and 1980s. The company was founded as Automated Simulations by Jim Connelley and Jon Freeman, originally using Epyx as a brand name for action-oriented games before renaming the company to match in 1983. Epyx published a long series of games through the 1980s. The company is currently owned by Bridgestone Multimedia Group Global.

History

Formation
In 1977, Susan Lee-Merrow invited Jon Freeman to join a Dungeons & Dragons game hosted by Jim Connelley and Jeff Johnson. Connelley later purchased a Commodore PET computer to help with the bookkeeping involved in being a dungeon master, and came up with the idea of writing a computer game for the machine before the end of the year so he could write it off on his taxes. Freeman had written on gaming for several publications, and joined Connelley in the design of a new space-themed wargame. Starting work around August 1978, Freeman wrote the basic rules, mission sets, background stories and the manual, while Connelley coded up the system in PET BASIC.

The BASIC era
The two formed Automated Simulations around Thanksgiving 1978 to market the game, and released it in December as Starfleet Orion. Examining contemporary magazines (Byte and Creative Computing) suggests this is the first commercial space-themed wargame for a personal computer. As the game was written in BASIC, it was easy to port to other home computers of the era, starting with the TRS-80 and then the Apple II, the latter featuring rudimentary graphics. They followed this game with 1979's Invasion Orion, which included a computer opponent so as not to require two human players.

The company's next release, Temple of Apshai, was very successful, selling over 20,000 copies. As the game was not a "simulation" of anything, the company introduced the Epyx brand name for these more action-oriented titles. Rated as the best computer game by practically every magazine of the era, Apshai was soon ported from the TRS-80 to additional systems, such as the Atari 8-bit family and Commodore 64. Apshai spawned a number of similar adventure games based on the same game engine, including two direct sequels, branded under the Dunjonquest label. The games were so successful that they were later re-released in 1985 as the Temple of Apshai Trilogy.

Using the same BASIC game engine, a series of "semi-action" games followed under the Epyx brand, including Crush, Crumble and Chomp!, Rescue at Rigel, and Star Warrior, each of which added twists to the Apshai engine.

Growth and action focus

Freeman became increasingly frustrated by Connelley's refusal to update the game engine. He left the company to start Free Fall Associates in 1981, leaving Connelley to lead what was now a large company.

A year later, Epyx was starting to have financial difficulties. Jim Connelley wanted and received money through venture capital, and the venture capitalists installed Michael Katz to manage the company. Connelley clashed with new management, left Epyx, and formed his own development team, The Connelley Group with all of the programmers going with him, but continued to work under the Epyx umbrella.

With no programmers to develop any games in-house, Michael Katz needed to hire programmers to ensure a steady supply of games. Several venture capital owners involved in Epyx also had ownership of a company called Starpath. While Starpath had several young programmers and hardware engineers, they were facing financial difficulties as well. Around this time, an independent submission to publish a game called Jumpman came through and was a big hit for Epyx. The success of Jumpman made Epyx a lot of money, so Michael Katz had the capital to create a merger between Epyx and Starpath, bringing Starpath's programmers and hardware engineers under the same company. Michael Katz left Epyx in 1984 after being hired away by Atari Corporation as their President of Entertainment Electronics Division (and later, became the President of Sega of America), and was replaced by Gilbert Freeman (no relation to Jon Freeman).

By 1983 Epyx discontinued its older games because, Jerry Pournelle reported, "its managers tell me that arcade games so outsell strategic games that it just isn't cost-effective to put programmer time on strategy." By early 1984, InfoWorld estimated that Epyx was the world's 16th-largest microcomputer-software company, with $10 million in 1983 sales. Many successful action games followed, including the hits Impossible Mission and the sports game Summer Games. The latter created a long run of successful sequels, including Summer Games II, Winter Games, California Games, and World Games. The company produced games based on licenses of Hot Wheels, G.I. Joe, and Barbie. In Europe, U.S. Gold published Epyx games for the Commodore 64, and also ported many of the games to other major European platforms such as the ZX Spectrum and Amstrad CPC.

For the Commodore 64, Epyx made the Fast Load cartridge which enables a fivefold speedup of floppy disk drive accesses through Commodore's very slow serial interface. Another hardware product was the Epyx 500XJ Joystick, which uses high-quality microswitches and a more ergonomic form factor than the standard Atari CX40 joystick while remaining compatible.

Starting in 1986, Epyx realized that the Commodore 64 was starting to show its age, and needed to think about the future of the company. They hired David Shannon Morse to explore the next generation of consoles and computers and to learn about their strengths. David's son wanted his father to come up with a portable game system, so he had a meeting with former colleagues at Amiga Corporation, R. J. Mical and Dave Needle, to see if there was a way to design a portable gaming system. Internally, the handheld gaming system they were working on was called the Handy. Unable to continue due to high costs, it was sold to Atari Corporation which brought it to market in 1989 as the Atari Lynx.

Litigation

In 1987, Epyx faced an important copyright infringement lawsuit from Data East USA regarding Epyx's Commodore 64 video game World Karate Championship. Data East thought the whole game, and particularly the depiction of the referee, looked too much like its 1984 arcade game Karate Champ. Data East won at the US District Court level and Judge William Ingram ordered Epyx to recall all copies of World Karate Championship. Epyx appealed the case to the United States Court of Appeals for the Ninth Circuit, who reversed the judgment and ruled in favor of Epyx, stating that copyright protection did not extend to the idea of a tournament karate game, but specific artistic choices not dictated by that idea. The Court noted that a "17.5 year-old boy" could see clear differences between the elements of each game actually subject to copyright.

Bankruptcy and asset sales
Epyx had become heavily dependent on the Commodore 64 market, which accounted for the bulk of its revenues most years, but by 1988 the C64 was an aging machine now in its sixth year and the focus of computer gaming was shifting to PC compatibles and 16-bit machines. Although the console market, dominated by the Nintendo Entertainment System, was highly lucrative, Epyx objected to Nintendo's strict rules and licensing policies and instead initiated a failed attempt to develop their own game console.

Epyx was unable to fulfill its contract with Atari to finish developing Lynx hardware and software, and the latter withheld payments that the former needed. By the end of 1989, Epyx discontinued developing computer games, began making only console games, and filed for Chapter 11 bankruptcy protection. According to Stephen Landrum, a long-time game programmer at Epyx, the company went bankrupt "because it never really understood why it had been successful in the past, and then decided to branch out in a lot of directions, all of which turned out to be failures."

Epyx had shrunk from 145 employees in 1988 to fewer than 20 by the end of 1989. After emerging from bankruptcy the company resumed game development but only for the Lynx, with Atari acting as publisher. In 1993, with eight employees left, they decided just to sell off the rest of the company. Bridgestone Media Group eventually acquired the rights the rest of Epyx's assets. Job offers were extended to the eight remaining employees, but only Peter Engelbrite accepted.

In 2006, British publisher System 3 announced it had licensed certain Epyx's assets on a time limited basis to release games such as California Games and Impossible Mission for Nintendo DS, PlayStation Portable, and Wii in 2007.

Products

Games

Other software

Hardware

Notes

References

External links
Epyx profile on MobyGames
"Epyx Journey" – An in-depth history of Epyx
Epyx history and game list – GOTCHA on GameSpy.
Images of some early Epyx brochures
Epyx Consumer Software Catalog Winter 1984
Epyx 500XJ Joystick Brochure
Epyx 500XJ Joystick Commercial (1986)

 
1993 disestablishments in California
Defunct computer hardware companies
Companies that filed for Chapter 11 bankruptcy in 1989
Video game companies established in 1978
Video game companies disestablished in 1993
Defunct video game companies of the United States